Sabaat is a 2020 Pakistani television series produced by Momina Duraid under MD Productions. It stars Mawra Hocane, Ameer Gilani, Sarah Khan and Usman Mukhtar in lead roles. Sabaat revolves around two ambitious individuals who belong to different classes, fall for each other and face hurdles. It premiered on 29 March 2020 on Hum TV. Sabaat aired weekly on Sundays. The series received high viewership ratings and was critically acclaimed. At the 20th Lux Style Awards, the series received five nominations.

Plot
Miraal  is a young arrogant woman belonging to the elite family class who is controlling and egoistic in nature. In short, a narcissist person. Her father, Seth Fareed is a wealthy businessman who supports her even in her negative thinking while her mother and grandmother try to make her understand values of life and that everything in this world is mortal. She always misbehaves with her grandmother because her grandmother believed that her beauty, intelligence and all qualities will fade one day. Her younger brother Hassan Fareed is somehow influenced by her and is studying engineering. Anaya Aziz is an ambitious, strong-headed, women's-rights activist studying at same university as of Hassan's. She and Hassan clash when she defeats him in an engineering model competition. Hassan  insults her in response. She taunts Hassan about him being dependent on his father for everything while he himself hasn't achieved anything by himself. Hassan  is deeply influenced by her words and starts to make money through online jobs and starts to take public transport.

He starts liking Anaya because of her differentiated and independent thinking. Miraal seeing a change in Hasan and not being able to control him anymore finds out about Anaya and his dispute and her brother's newly found love for her. She reaches university and openly insults Anaya to which Anaya calmly responds and Miraal slaps her in anger. This news reaches Hassan and he confronts Miraal. Their grandmother dies and Miraal  began to feel disturbed. Hassan helps Anaya in taking down a guy who was blackmailing her friend and in response got shot. He is recovered and proposes Anaya which she accepts. He sends his parents to her house where his father (who supports Miraal that Hasan should not marry Anaya as she comes from middle-class background) humiliates her parents while his mother apologizes to them for misbehavior. Anaya for her parents' respect then rejects Hassan's proposal but then finally gives in after his persuasion. They marry while Miraal does not attend the ceremony. She also burns Anaya and Hassan's room on their wedding night and tries to take revenge by marrying on the same day but her fiancé Ali flees on the wedding day. Their Walima is also cancelled due to Miraal and Fareed Sahab threats. Anaya also joins company whereas Fareed Sahab makes Miraal Ceo of the company. Miraal degrades Anaya. She remains calm and collected despite Miraal degrading behavior while Hassan attempts to make his father understand about Miraal's doings. Miraal's senses become overshadowed by her grandmother's words and she began to see psychiatrist Dr. Haris who falls in love with her. When Miraal slaps Anaya in front of employees, Anaya feels humiliated and leaves office and goes to her parents' house. Hasan, upon learning of this, decides to leave the house while his father still supports Miraal.

They get home on rent and Anaya and Hassan started finding jobs for making money. Anaya gets a job. But unfortunately, the supreme court said that no construction takes place in the country for six months. This news makes Anaya and Hassan upset about jobs. Dr. Haris proposes to Miraal. Then Miraal talks to her parents who agreed about Miraal's decision. They marry. Hassan  gets a job through his friend Atif in Yasir Qureshi's office where he is mistreated and humiliated on a daily basis whereas Anaya gets promoted in her office. Hassan’s friend Atif starts to create doubts in his mind about Anaya upon Miraal's request. Hassan starts to believe that Anaya has an affair with his boss, and confronts her on the day Anaya goes to the doctor to realises she is expecting a child. She realizes Hassan’s doubtful nature and does not reply to his accusation and does not even tell him about her pregnancy. Hassan returns to his parents' house. After some time, Anaya's father dies which breaks her completely. The money her dad has saved also gets wasted by frauds. Anaya gets a leave from her office and bakes cakes for her living. She has a baby boy and names him Ibrahim Aziz, her father's name. On the other hand, Miraal finds out his husband is still continuing his job, which infuriates her and she leaves her home and threatens her husband that she will get a divorce. Ali returns and realizes he can't live without Miraal so apologises and starts to create space in Miraal’s heart for him. Miraal  decides to take divorce from Haris while Haris does not want to take divorce. Then Anaya resumes her office and on the first day of her office, she learns that her new boss is Yasir Qureshi. When Atif tells Hassan that Anaya is working under Yasir Qureshi, Hassan decides to take divorce from Anaya. Yasir Qureshi orders Anaya to go on a trip to Islamabad and when she goes there, Yasir comes to her room in the night and gives her promotion letter but in the morning she resigns from the job and throws the promotion letter on Yasir's face. On the same day Miraal goes through an accident and due to the accident her spinal cord gets injured and is paralyzed but Dr. Haris takes care of her. She realizes her mistakes and confesses everything to Hassan that what she had done to Anaya in the past. Hassan feels ashamed and goes to Anaya's home to seek forgiveness but Anaya doesn't forgives him. Then Miraal goes to Anaya's home to seek forgiveness and asks her to forgive Hassan too. Anaya forgives Hassan. Anaya's mother adopts a boy named Muhammad Ali as she was alone. Haris takes care of Miraal but she is still guilty of what she has done to Haris in the past but Haris forgives her and then Anaya and Hassan and Miraal and Haris live happily ever after.

Cast 
 Sarah Khan as Miraal Fareed/Miraal Haris,Dr.Haris's wife, 
 Mawra Hocane as Anaya Aziz/ Anaya Hassan,Hassan's wife
 Ameer Gilani as Hassan Fareed,Anaya's Husband,
 Usman Mukhtar as Dr.Haris Ahmed,Miraal's Husband
 Javeria Kamran as Nirmal, Miraal's Best friend 
 Meiraj Haq as Dr. Murad, Dr.Haris's Best friend 
 Jahanzeb Khan as Ali,Miraal's ex-fiance 
 Moazzam Ali Khan as Mr. Fareed,Hassan and Miraal's Father 
 Laila Zuberi as Mrs. Fareed, Hassan and Miraal's Mother
 Seemi Raheel as Mrs Bushra Aziz, Anaya's Mother
 Syed Mohammed Ahmed as Mr. Aziz, Anaya's Father 
 Abbas Ashraf Awan as Atif, Hassan's Best friend 
 Azra Mansoor as Hassan and Miraal's grandmother (Dead)
 Kashif Anwar as Yasir Qureshi (Hassan and Anaya's boss)
 Haider Rifaat as Zahid

Soundtrack

The OST is composed by Naveed Nashad on lyrics of Kashif Anwar and sung by Ali Sethi.

Production

The production location of the series was Pir Mehr Ali Shah Arid Agriculture University, Rawalpindi. It marked Khan's second portrayal of antagonist after Alvida.

Reception

Episode ranking (TRPs)

Critical reception 

Sabaat received positive reviews from critics with its release and was praised for its script and the performances of the cast especially of Khan (who usually plays weeping characters) and Gillani (being a newcomer). The writer's fine take on multiple themes such as Classism, women portrayal and mental health was lauded by critics.

Awards and nominations

References

External links
 Sabaat on Official website
 

Hum TV original programming
2020 Pakistani television series debuts
Pakistani drama television series
Urdu-language television shows
2020s Pakistani television series